Bill Allison may refer to:
 Bill Allison (actor), former casino owner and actor
 Bill Allison (baseball) (1850–1887), 19th-century baseball player
 Bill Allison (footballer) (1908–1981), English footballer